Jerry Reynolds may refer to:

 Jerry Reynolds (American football) (born 1970), American football offensive lineman
 Jerry Reynolds (basketball, born 1944), American former professional basketball coach and current executive in the NBA
 Jerry Reynolds (basketball, born 1962), retired American professional basketball player
 Jerry Reynolds (footballer) (1867–1944), Scottish footballer

See also 
Gerry Reynolds (disambiguation)
Gerald Reynolds (disambiguation)